Blackout! is the debut studio album by American hip hop duo Method Man & Redman. It is the first full-length release by Method Man and Redman after many collaborations. The album continued a string of highly successful Def Jam releases in the late 1990s. The album debuted at number three on the US Billboard 200 with first week sales of 254,000 copies and served as a bit of a precursor to the 2001 major studio film How High. Both rappers enjoyed perhaps the height of their popularity as a tandem after the success of the album and its three charted singles. The singles were also popular videos which were mainstays on MTV and BET. The sequel to the album, Blackout! 2, was released on May 19, 2009.

Background
Originally the name of the album was to be Amerikaz Most Blunted and was advertised as that for months before the release, but they changed it to the more commercially acceptable Blackout!. The CD version of the album features three previously released bonus tracks; "Well All Rite Cha" also appeared on Redman's solo album, Doc's Da Name 2000, "Big Dogz" from Method Man's Tical 2000: Judgement Day and 1995's critically acclaimed single "How High".

The most popular of these previous collaborations was on the song "How High" from the soundtrack to The Show. The album's three singles, "Y.O.U.", "Da Rockwilder" and "Tear It Off", spearheaded the highly hyped release to go platinum on January 6, 2000, more than three months after the album's release. The album has also been certified platinum in Canada (100,000 copies). The album has sold 1,575,000 copies to date. . Blackout is also considered a landmark for both rappers and for East Coast Hip Hop.

Critical reception
Rolling Stone (11/11/99, p. 132) - 4 stars out of 5 - "...a tight-as-drum album in an era of half-assed efforts."

Entertainment Weekly (10/10/99, p. 73) - "...when hip-hop's most playfully creative rhyme stylers throw down like two superballs in a rubber room, they're unstoppable - and make rap's most joyous ride." - Rating: A-

The Wire (1/00, p. 100) - "...skulk-funk...Redman moans a melody of dank basement isolation, while on 'Cereal Killer' he sabotages over vamping guitar....Meth executes some taut syncopation...on which his syllables alternate cadences with producer Eric Sermon's thumpingest track of the LP."

The Source (2/00, p. 95) - Included in The Source's "Top 10 Albums of the Year [1999]."

Commercial performance
Blackout debuted at number three on the US Billboard 200 chart, selling 254,000 copies in its first week. On January 6, 2000, the album was certified platinum by the Recording Industry Association of America (RIAA) for sales of over a million copies. As of October 2009, the album has 1,575,000 copies in the United States.

Track listing

Charts

Weekly charts

Year-end charts

Singles

Certifications

See also
 List of number-one R&B albums of 1999 (U.S.)

References

External links
 Release history at Discogs
 

1999 debut albums
Method Man albums
Redman (rapper) albums
Def Jam Recordings albums
Albums produced by Erick Sermon
Albums produced by DJ Scratch
Albums produced by Rockwilder
Albums produced by RZA
Collaborative albums